This is a list of people from Omaha, Nebraska, in the United States.



A
 Farrah Abraham - reality television personality, singer, pornographic actress, and writer
 Hazel Abel — politician
 Titus Adams — professional football player
 Wesley Addy — actor
 Steve Alaimo — musician, record producer
 Houston Alexander — professional MMA fighter, radio host, rapper
 Kurt Andersen — author
 Craig Anton — actor, comedian
 Adele Astaire — dancer, entertainer
 Fred Astaire — dancer, actor
 Guerin Austin — Miss Nebraska USA 2004
 Pamela Austin — actress

B
 Max Baer — boxer
 Byron Bailey — professional American and Canadian football player
 Letitia Baldrige — etiquette expert, Kennedy White House aide
 Rex Barney — Major League Baseball pitcher for Brooklyn Dodgers
 John Beasley — actor
 Tom Becka — radio host
 Jackson Berkey — composer, pianist, instructor
 Wade Boggs — baseball player, Hall of Famer
 Bob Boozer — National Basketball Association - player and Olympic gold medalist
 Steve Borden — professional wrestler better known by his stage name of Sting
 Gutzon Borglum — painter, sculptor of Mount Rushmore
 James E. Boyd — Mayor of Omaha, 1881-1883 and 1885-1887; seventh Governor of the state of Nebraska
 L. Brent Bozell, Jr. — conservative activist and Catholic writer
 Marlon Brando — actor
 Wade Brorby — United States federal appellate judge
 Mildred D. Brown — founder of the Omaha Star
 Brandin Bryant — football player
 Warren Buffett — billionaire investor and philanthropist
 Mellona Moulton Butterfield — china painter, teacher
 Steven Kenneth Bonnell II - American political commentator,  former Twitch streamer, and YouTube personality known online as Destiny

C
 Lance Cade — professional wrestler
Lloyd Cardwell — played professional football for the Detroit Lions; coached at UNO 
 Buddy Carlyle — professional baseball pitcher
 Ernie Chambers — Nebraska state senator
 Jason Christiansen — baseball pitcher
 Montgomery Clift — actor
 Abbie Cobb — actress
 James M. Connor — actor
 Barney Cotton — college football coach
 Terence Crawford — undefeated World Champion boxer
 Edward Creighton — founder of Creighton University
 George P. Cronk — Los Angeles City Council member, 1945–52
 General George Crook — US Army officer
 Eric Crouch — football player, Heisman Trophy winner
 Blase J. Cupich -  Archbishop of the Archdiocese of Chicago

D
 DrLupo – streamer and YouTuber
 Jeff Draheim — film editor
 Nicholas D'Agosto — television and film actor
 Alfonza W. Davis — Tuskegee Airman
 Chip Davis — musician, founder of Mannheim Steamroller
 Dick Davis — NFL player
 Brian Deegan — FMX rider
 Tom Dennison — political boss of Omaha, 1890s-1933
 Adam Devine — actor
 Mike Donehey — lead singer of Christian rock band Tenth Avenue North
 Richard Dooling — novelist, screenwriter
 David Doyle — actor
 Charles W. "Chuck" Durham — civil engineer, philanthropist, Chairman Emeritus of HDR, Inc

E
Jake Ellenberger — professional MMA fighter in the UFC
Experience Estabrook — Attorney General of Wisconsin
G. Estabrook — opera composer; daughter of Experience Estabrook

F
 Henry Fonda — actor
 Peter Fonda — actor
 Gerald Ford — 38th President of the United States
 Sally Fox — member of Vermont General Assembly; lawyer
 The Faint — Post-Punk band

G
 Jorge Garcia — actor
 Roxane Gay — writer and professor
 Bob Gibson — Baseball Hall of Fame
 Terry Goodkind — author
 Ahman Green — professional football player
 Bennett Greenspan — founder of Family Tree DNA
 Jake Guentzel — professional ice hockey player

H
Breece Hall — NFL running back
Tim Halperin - American singer-songwriter 
Raphael Hamilton — American Jesuit and professor of history at Marquette University
Ron Hansen — author, screenwriter
Wynonie Harris — rhythm & blues singer
Harry Haywood — African-American Communist leader
Jean Heather — actress
Major General Stuart Heintzelman — U.S. Army officer
Gregory M. Herek — social psychologist and professor
Nick Hexum — singer/guitarist of Omaha's 311
Hallee Hirsh — actress
Chris Holbert — Colorado politician
Sarah Hollins — beauty queen and TV personality
Dave Hoppen — NBA player
Jeremy Horn — mixed martial arts fighter
John Howell — NFL player
Cathy Hughes — businesswoman; founder and president of Radio One

I
 Doug Ingle — keyboardist for Iron Butterfly

J
 Joseph R. Jelinek — U.S. Army Brigadier General, deputy director of Army National Guard
 Nikko Jenkins — convicted spree killer
 Steve Jennum — mixed martial artist
 Ryan Jensen — mixed martial arts fighter
 Simon Joyner — singer, songwriter

K
 Timothy J. Kadavy — U.S. Army Major General, Adjutant General of Nebraska National Guard
 Jay Karnes — actor
 Tim Kasher — singer-songwriter, Cursive and The Good Life
 Alex Kava — author
 Kenton Keith — professional football player
 Charlotte Kemp — Playboy Playmate (Miss December 1982)
 Mina Kimes — Investigative Journalist, ESPN Senior Writer
 Charles Henry King — pioneer businessman
 Jaime King — actress, model
 Chris Klein — actor
 Ed Koterba —  journalist
 Jeff Koterba — editorial cartoonist, musician, author
 Jason Kreis — soccer player, coach of Real Salt Lake
 Saul Kripke — philosopher
 Swoosie Kurtz — actress

L
 Brigadier General Frank Purdy Lahm — U.S. Army officer
 Christopher Lasch — historian, social critic
 Oudious Lee — football player
 Matty Lewis — musician, Zebrahead
 Malcolm X (born Little) - human rights activist
 Samuel Little — serial killer 
 Preston Love — jazz player
 Henry T. Lynch — cancer researcher and professor at Creighton University

M
 Ike Mahoney — NFL player
 Skate Maloley — rapper
 Erin McCarthy — professional ten-pin bowler, 2022 U.S. Women's Open champion
 Sean McDermott — NFL Head Coach of Buffalo Bills
 Ed McGivern — shooter
 Dorothy McGuire — actress
 Andy Milder — actor
 Jay Milder — artist
 Buddy Miles — musician
 Anthony Michael Milone — Roman catholic bishop
 Henry Monsky — attorney and communal leader
 Rowena Moore — civic and labor activist
 Carol Morris — Miss Iowa USA 1956, Miss USA 1956, Miss Universe 1956
 Gerald T. Mullin - Minnesota state legislator, lawyer, and businessman
 Frances Miller Mumaugh — painter
 Charlie Munger — billionaire investor

N
 John Najjar — auto engineer, designed Ford Mustang
 Jim Newman — television producer
 Nick Nolte — actor

O
 Conor Oberst — singer-songwriter, Bright Eyes and Desaparecidos
 Tillie Olsen — author
 Jed Ortmeyer — professional ice hockey player
 Sono Osato — dancer and actress

P
 John W. Patterson — African-American baseball outfielder in the Negro leagues
 Niles Paul — NFL receiver for the Washington Redskins
 Alexander Payne — Oscar-winning screenwriter and director
 Neal Pionk - NHL player
 Mark Pope — NBA player
 Scott Porter — actor
 Nathan Post — 7th and 10th Governor of American Samoa
 Ron Prince — college football coach
 Justin Patton, NBA basketball player and player for Hapoel Eilat of the Israeli Basketball Premier League, first-round selection in the 2017 NBA draft

Q
 Daniel Quinn — author

R
 Anne Ramsey — actress
 Andrew Rannells — actor
 James Raschke — professional wrestler known as Baron Von Raschke
 Origen D. Richardson — fourth Lieutenant Governor of Michigan
 Mark Richt — college football coach
 J. Joseph Ricketts — billionaire
 Matthew Ricketts — first African-American graduate from UNMC; first African-American state legislator
 Pete Ricketts — Governor of Nebraska
 Thomas S. Ricketts — owner of baseball's Chicago Cubs
 Trevor Roach — football player
 Andy Roddick — professional tennis player
 Johnny Rodgers — football player, 1972 Heisman Trophy winner
 Joe Rogers — Colorado lieutenant governor
 Rainbow Rowell — author
 Darin Ruf (born 1986) — major league baseball player
 Amber Ruffin - comedian and writer
 Colden Ruggles - U.S. Army brigadier general
 Edward Ruscha — artist and photographer

S
 Penny Sackett — astronomer and Chief Scientist of Australia
 Symone Sanders — Democratic strategist, spokesperson for Bernie Sanders's 2016 presidential campaign
 Gale Sayers — professional football player, Pro Football Hall of Fame inductee
 Walter Scott, Jr. — billionaire
Josephine Platner Shear — archaeologist and numismatist
 Leisa Sheridan — Playboy Playmate (Miss July 1993)
 JoJo Siwa — dancer from television series Dance Moms
 Skate — rapper
 Elliott Smith — singer/songwriter
 Nicholas Sparks — author
 Skip Stephenson — actor and comedian from TV series Real People
 Jean Stothert – Mayor of Omaha
 Todd Storz — entrepreneur who introduced Top-40 radio format
 Mike Sullivan — 29th Governor of Wyoming
 Sarah Rose Summers — Miss Nebraska USA 2018 and Miss USA 2018
 Carl A. Swanson — founder of Swanson
 Inga Swenson — actress

T
 Jerry Tagge — NFL player for the Green Bay Packers
Khyri Thomas (born 1996) - basketball player for Maccabi Tel Aviv of the Israeli Basketball Premier League and the EuroLeague
JT Thor - NBA player for the Charlotte Hornets and their G League affiliate the Greensboro Swarm
 Donald E. Thorin — cinematographer
 Thomas Tibbles —  late 19th-century journalist and Native American rights activist
 Chris Tormey — college football coach
 Mark Traynowicz — football player
 John Trudell — poet, Native American activist, actor
 Stanley M. Truhlsen — professor and philanthropist
 Steve Turre — jazz trombonist

U
 Gabrielle Union — actress

W
 Luigi Waites — jazz drummer and vibraphonist
 Eleazer Wakeley — jurist and politician
 Chris Ware — graphic novelist
 Dan Warthen (born 1952) — major league baseball pitcher and coach
 Fee Waybill (John Waldo Waybill) — singer/songwriter
 Geneice Wilcher — beauty pageant winner
 Paul Williams — singer-songwriter, actor
 Roger Williams — pianist
 Julie Wilson — singer and actress
 Andre Woolridge — professional basketball player

Z
 Paula Zahn — news personality

See also
 List of lists about Omaha, Nebraska
 List of people from North Omaha, Nebraska
 Founding figures of Omaha, Nebraska
 People from Omaha (category)
 People from Omaha by occupation (category)

References

 
Omaha, Nebraska
People
Omaha